Korean ethnic nationalism, is a political ideology and a form of ethnic and racial identity that is widely prevalent by the Korean people in Korea, particularly in South Korea. It is based on the belief that Koreans form a nation, and an ethnic group. It is centered on the notion of the minjok, a term that had been coined in Imperial Japan ("minzoku") in the early Meiji period. Minjok has been translated as "nation", "people", "ethnic group", "race", and "race-nation".

This conception started to emerge among Korean intellectuals after the Japanese-imposed protectorate of 1905, leading to Korea's colonization by Japan. The Japanese then tried to persuade the Koreans that both nations were of the same racial stock to assimilate them, similar to what they did with the Ainu and Ryukyuans. The notion of the Korean minjok was first made popular by essayist and historian Shin Chaeho in his New Reading of History (1908), a history of Korea from the mythical times of Dangun to the fall of Balhae in 926 CE. Shin portrayed the minjok as a warlike race that had fought bravely to preserve Korean identity, had later declined, and now needed to be reinvigorated. During the period of Japanese rule (1910–1945), this belief in the uniqueness of the Korean minjok gave an impetus for resisting Japanese assimilation policies and historical scholarship.

In the 1960s, South Korean president Park Chung-hee strengthened this "ideology of racial purity" to legitimize his authoritarian rule. Contemporary South Korean historians continue to write about the nation's "unique racial and cultural heritage", with some even going further to add that Koreans are generally more "superior" than other ethnic groups and nations. 

In recent decades, statistics has showed that South Korea is becoming an increasingly multi-ethnic society. Nevertheless, the South Korean population continues to identify itself as danil minjok (Hanja: 單一民族, "one people") joined by a common "bloodline". As a result, renewed emphasis on the purity of the Korean "blood" has caused tensions, leading to renewed debates on multi-ethnicity and racism both in South Korea and abroad by Koreans. Korean racial nationalism has also been described as constituting a civic religion of sorts. As BR Myers explores in his book The Cleanest Race, Koreans (both North and South) possess a strong sense of 'ethnic pride', driven in part by how more powerful neighbors (Japan, China) bullied Korea throughout its history.

Some South Koreans argue that 'Korean ethnic nationalism' cannot be equated with 'racism' or 'racial nationalism' in the Japanese or Western sense. According to them, because of Korea's historical specificity, 'Korean ethnic nationalism' can coexist with 'civic nationalism'. Some view that criticism of Korean ethnic nationalism is inappropriate because it is an overly Western-centered analysis. They usually point to "pro-Japanese colonialism" and "white supremacy" based on "GDP racism" in South Korean society and internalized racism, it is not Korean ethnic nationalist-based racism.

History

Early usage and origins
The earliest recorded forms of a unified Korean nationalism are recorded in the 16th century during the Japanese Invasions of Korea. The rise of the 'uibyeong' or 'righteous armies' formed amongst civilians due to the relatively strong conception of national identity.
Contemporary Korean ideology of a "pure Korean race" began in the early 20th century when the Japanese annexed Korea and launched a campaign to persuade them that they were of the same pure racial stock as the Japanese themselves.

Brian Reynolds Myers, a professor at Dongseo University, argues that seeing the failure of the pure assimilationist policy, Japanese imperial ideologues changed their policy into creating a Korean ethnic-patriotism on par with the Japanese one. They encouraged Koreans to take pride in their Koreanness, in their history, heritage, culture and "dialect" as a "brother nation" going back to a "common ancestry" with the Japanese.

Independence

Shin Chaeho (1880–1936), the founder of the nationalistic historiography of modern Korea and a Korean independence movement activist, published his influential book of reconstructed history Joseon Sanggosa (The Early History of Joseon) in 1924–25, proclaiming that Koreans are descendants of Dangun, the legendary ancestor of Korean people, who merged with Buyo of Manchuria to form the Goguryeo people.

Borrowing from the Japanese theory of nation, Shin Chaeho located the martial roots of the Korean in Goguryeo, which he depicted as militarist and expansionist which turned out to inspire pride and confidence in the resistance against the Japanese. In order to establish Korean uniqueness, he also replaced the story of Gija Joseon, whose founder (Gija) was the paternal uncle or brother of the Chinese Shang emperor Zhou, with the Dangun legend and asserted that it was an important way to establish Korea's uniqueness.

After independence in the late 1940s, despite the split between North and South Korea, neither side disputed the ethnic homogeneity of the Korean nation based on a firm conviction that they are purest descendant of a legendary progenitor and half-god figure called Dangun who founded Gojoseon in 2333 BCE based on the description of the Dongguk Tonggam (1485).

Reception
In both Koreas, pure blood theory is a common belief, with even some South Korean presidents subscribing to it.

Some Korean scholars observed that the pure blood theory served as a useful tool for the South Korean government to make its people obedient and easy to govern when the country was embroiled in ideological turmoil. It was especially true in the dictatorial leaderships by former presidents Syngman Rhee and Park Chung-hee when nationalism was incorporated into anti-Communism.

Role in contemporary South Korean society
In South Korea, the notion of "pure blood" results in discrimination toward people of both "foreign-blood" and "mixed blood". Those with this "mixed blood" or "foreign blood" are sometimes referred to as Honhyeol in South Korea.

The South Korean nationality law is based on jus sanguinis instead of jus solis, which is a territorial principle that takes into account the place of birth when bestowing nationality. In this context, most South Koreans have stronger attachment to South Koreans residing in foreign countries and foreigners of South Korean descent, than to naturalized South Korean citizens and expatriates residing in South Korea. In 2005, the opposition Grand National Party suggested a revision of the current South Korean nationality law to allow South Korean nationality to be bestowed to people who are born in South Korea regardless of the nationalities of their parents but it was discarded due to unfavorable public opinion against such a measure.

According to Jon Huer, a columnist for the Korea Times:

Changing attitudes
Emma Campbell from the Australian National University argues that the conceptions of South Korean nationalism are evolving among young people and that a new form is emerging that has globalised cultural characteristics. These characteristics challenge the role of ethnicity in South Korean nationalism. According to Campbell's study, for which she interviewed 150 South Koreans in their twenties, the desire for reunification is declining. However, these who are in favor of a Korean unification state reasons different from ethnic nationalism. The respondents stated that they only wanted unification if it would not disrupt life in the South or if North Korea achieves economic parity with the South. A small number of respondents further mentioned that they support a "unification on the condition that it did not take place in their lifetime." Another reason stated for the wish for unification was the access to North Korea's natural resources and cheap labor. This notion of evolving nationalism has been further elaborated by the meaning of uri nara ( our country [sic!]) for young South Koreans, which only refers to South Korea for them instead to the whole Korean peninsula. Campbell's interviews further showed that many young South Koreans have no problems to accepting foreigners as part of uri nara.

A poll by the Asan Institute for Policy Studies in 2015 found that only 5.4% of South Koreans in their twenties saw North Koreans as people sharing the same bloodline with them. The poll also found that only 11% of South Koreans associated North Korea with Koreans, with most people associating them with words like military, war or nuclear weapons. It also found that most South Koreans expressed deeper feelings of "closeness" with Americans and Chinese than with North Koreans.

According to a December 2017 survey released by the Korea Institute for National Unification, 72.1% of South Koreans in their 20s believe reunification is unnecessary. Moreover, about 50% of men in their 20s see North Korea as an outright enemy that they want nothing to do with.

Steven Denney from the University of Toronto said, "Younger South Koreans feel closer to North Korean migrants than, say, foreign workers, but they will feel closer to a native born child of non-Korean ethnicity than a former resident of North Korea."

Criticism
B. R. Myers noted in a 2010 New York Times editorial that there was relatively little public outrage in South Korea over the sinking of the ROKS Cheonan earlier that year, which he attributed partly to a feeling of sympathy towards North Korea among South Koreans, resulting from a closer identification with the Korean race than with the South Korean state. Myers also stated that race nationalism in South Korea undermines the South Korean citizenry's patriotism towards South Korea by increasing sympathy towards North Korea, thus threatening the country's national security in the face of North Korean aggression, a sentiment shared by Korea Times columnist Jon Huer. He stated that South Koreans' race nationalism "is no problem when you have a nation state like Japan or Denmark, but is a problem when you have a state divided." Myers has also stated that conversely, North Korea does not suffer from this dilemma as by and large the North Korean people tend to equate the "Korean race" and the country of North Korea as being one and the same, unlike in South Korea where the "Korean race" and South Korea are largely seen as different entities.

Social issues 

As part of the deterioration of relations between North Korea and the Soviet Union in the early 1960s, North Korea  forced its male citizens who had married Soviet and Eastern European women to divorce, whereupon the women, a few hundred, were expelled from the country.  North Korea is alleged to have abducted foreign women in the 1970s to marry to foreign men that immigrated to North Korea in order to keep these men from having children with North Korean women. North Korea is accused of killing babies born to North Korean mothers and Chinese fathers.

In 2006, American football player Hines Ward, who was born in Seoul to a South Korean mother and a black American father, became the first South Korean-born American to win the NFL Super Bowl's MVP award. This achievement threw him into the media spotlight in South Korea. When he traveled to South Korea for the first time, he raised unprecedented attention to the acceptance of "mixed-blood" children. He also donated US$1 million to establish the "Hines Ward Helping Hands Foundation", which the media called "a foundation to help mixed-race children like himself in South Korea, where they have suffered discrimination." Hines Ward was granted "honorary" South Korean citizenship.

However, while some South Koreans are fascinated by the biracial sportsman, the majority of ordinary mixed-race people and migrant workers face various forms of discrimination and prejudice. In 2007, the "Korean pure blood theory" became an international issue when the U.N. Committee on the International Convention Elimination of All Forms of Racial Discrimination urged better education on the pure blood theory is needed, especially for judicial workers such as police officers, lawyers, prosecutors and judges. The suggestion received mixed reception in South Korea in which some raised a concern that foreigners will invade the South Korean culture and challenge national sovereignty. Others say that the embrace of multiethnicism will diminish chances of reunifying the Korean Peninsula.

In 2007, the South Korean government passed the Act on Treatment of Foreigners. Later in 2007, the U.N. Committee on the Elimination of Racial Discrimination praised the Act on Treatment of Foreigners, but also expressed a number of concerns. The committee was concerned "about the persistence of widespread societal discrimination against foreigners, including migrant workers and children born from inter-ethnic unions, in all areas of life, including employment, marriage, housing, education and interpersonal relationships." It also noted that the terminology such as "pure blood" and "mixed blood" used in South Korea, including by the government, is widespread, and may reinforce concepts of racist superiority. The committee recommended improvement in the areas of treatment of migrant workers, abuse of and violence against foreign women married to South Korean citizens, and trafficking of foreign women for the purpose of sexual exploitation or domestic servitude. It also noted that contrary to popular domestic perception, South Korea was no longer "ethnically homogenous".

Another legislation aimed at improving the integration of ethnic minorities into South Korean society, the Support for Multicultural Families Act was passed in 2008 but revised in 2011. According to 2009, statistics published by South Korean Ministry of Health and Welfare, there were 144,385 couples of international marriage in South Korea as of May 2008. 88.4% of immigrants were female, and 61.9% were from China. Recently it has been argued that South Korean society had already become a multicultural society, although foreigners make up for 3.4% of the South Korean population. As of 2011, ten ministries and agencies of South Korean government are supporting international couples and foreign workers in South Korea toward the cultural plurality.

Existing provisions in South Korean criminal law may be used to punish acts of racial discrimination, but were never used for that purpose until 2009, when the first case of a South Korean citizen verbally insulting a foreigner have been brought to court.

In 2010, the South Korean government changed the oath of enlistment of Korean soldiers, so that they do not swear allegiance anymore to the Korean race. Similarly, prior to 2007 the South Korean pledge of allegiance was towards the "Korean race" rather than towards the country of South Korea.

A poll from 2015 found that Koreans tend to amalgamate Korean ethnic nationalism with classism, resulting in a "hierarchy", viewing immigrants from more affluent countries less negatively than those who came from poorer countries.

Liberal and progressive minjok ideology 

Since the 2000s, 'minjok ideology' (민족/민족주의, "Korean 'ethnic' nationalism") has appeared more in liberal or progressive camps than in the conservative. The conservative camp values anti-communism more and has stronger support for 'kukmin ideology' (국민/국가주의, "South Korean 'civic'/'state people' nationalism") in the 21st century. South Korean liberals and progressives who support minjok ideology tend to perceive (Korean) minjok ideology as "liberation" and "resistance" rather than "racist" (in the Western sense). They believe that minjok ideology is necessary to remove right-wing authoritarianism stemming from the past anti-communist military dictatorship, fight the traitors to minjok, and move the Korean Peninsula toward pacifism. South Korean liberals and progressives argue that minjok ideology does not contradict civic nationalism (시민 민족주의) because it is anti-imperialism. However, this is an average and relative tendency, and as racial diversity increases in South Korea, liberals are also weakening their emphasis on minjok in the 2020s, except when they express anti-imperialist sentiment toward Japan. Liberals and progressives insist on diversifying '[South] Korean identity' (한국인) into minjok living in North Korea, non-bloody/non-ethnic South Korean nationality, and cultural identity. (Liberals ans progressives mainly believe that minjok ideology is needed to resist pro-Japanese colonialism, and that civil nationalism is needed in other issues related to immigration and race.)

South Korean liberals and progressives tend to place more importance on political correctness in many non-Korean ethnic and cultural issues. Conservatives insist on reciprocity and on limiting foreigners' right to vote (외국인 투표권 or 외국인 참정권) in local elections. Conservatives are more opposed to 'Anti-discrimination laws' (차별금지법) that systematically outlaw racism than liberals. Liberals and progressives oppose reciprocity and argue that "all" foreigners with certain conditions should be given the right to vote in local elections. Liberals are more pro-immigrant rights, multiculturalism and pro-naturalized citizens than conservatives.

Liberals and progressives oppose the concept of "danil minjok" and "pure blood", which was supported by far-right Ilminists and Park Chung-hee Thoughtists in the past.

Many liberals and progressives object to BR Myers' comparison of the North Korean regime to Japanese fascism, which, according to them, has nothing to do with Nazism or Japanese fascism trying to invade other minjok countries because nationalism of the North Korean government is a resistance-nationalism against neighboring powers. They rather point out that they are more like Japanese fascists because some of the conservatives in South Korea were Chinilpa. Indeed, some of South Korea's conservative elites cooperated with the Japanese Empire before 1945 and participated in their war crimes. As a result, South Korean liberals and progressives see it as anti-fascism to eliminate Chinilpa and support strong anti-Japanese Korean nationalism.

Meanwhile, right-wing culturally conservatives who support anti-communist kukmin ideology often stimulate ethnic-exclusionist racism rather than liberal-to-progressives in issues related to refugees. Liberals are more friendly to accepting refugees than conservatives. Conservatives in South Korea tend to emphasize the kukmin ideology when they oppose refugees, (나는 대한민국 국민입니다 or 국민이 먼저다) but conservatives kukmin ideology is close to "ethnic nationalism limited to South Korea" (대한민국 민족주의 or 남한만의 민족주의), which does not include North Koreans (on the 38th parallel) and Joseonjok. Some 'anti-Chinese conservatives' denounce the minjok ideology and at the same time show their disgust for Joseonjok. While liberals relatively tend to perceive Joseonjok as the same minjok, conservatives are relatively more anti-Chinese, so racism and xenophobia toward Joseonjok are common among conservatives.

On March 1, 2018, Lee Jae-myung said that Germany and Japan, the aggressive and (fascist) war-crime states that started World War II, should have been divided into two countries, but it was wrong to divide the Korean Peninsula, which has done nothing wrong instead of Japan. He said the division of Korean was an excuse for Korean war.

The United States's ambassador to South Korea, Harry B. Harris Jr., who is of Japanese descent, has been criticized in the South Korean media for having a moustache, which his detractors say resembles those of the several leaders of the Empire of Japan. A CNN article written by Joshua Berlinger suggested that given Harris's ancestry, the criticism of his mustache may be due to racism. South Korean liberal media point out that Harry B. Harris Jr. had similar words and actions to the right-wing of Japan. On November 30, 2019, Harris verbally abused, saying, "There are many Jongbuk leftists around the president of Moon" (문 대통령 종북좌파에 둘러싸여 있다는데). On January 16, 2020, he was criticized by the Democratic Party of Korea for "interference in internal affairs" (내정 간섭) for saying that U.S. consultation was needed on tourism to North Korea. South Korean liberal media believe the attack on his beard is not racist because he attacked the South Korea's "national sovereignty" (주권) using rhetoric like "Japanese colonial governor" (일본 총독).

Some progressive nationalists' attitudes toward racism and Korean ethnic nationalism are complicated, mainly believing that racial discrimination can never be established for a race that they consider to be a 'perpetrators' minjok by their standards, while opposing discrimination against a race that is considered a 'victims' minjok. Anti-American, anti-Chinese, and anti-Japanese sentiment has increased in South Korea since the COVID-19 pandemic, and negative reports on Americans, Chinese, and Japanese have also increased in South Korea's major media. Some progressive nationalist biased media such as Pressian (프레시안), even argue American/Japanese/Chinese  the use of racial contempt Korean-word for American/Japanese/Chinese is justified because they have historically plagued Korea. It has been suggested that many Korean dramas and movies' negative portrayals of Americans compared to North Koreans may be influenced by ethnic solidarity, as well as anti-colonialism. However, they oppose racial discrimination against non-American/Japanese/Chinese races more strongly than conservatives. Many progressive nationalists strongly oppose anti-Black racism in South Korea because they tend to consider racial hierarchy and anti-imperialist minjung (민중) ideology. (Progressive nationalists believe that Koreans have racial 'privileges' over black peoples.) They argue that South Korean society should move toward multiracial democracy (다인종 민주주의). However, not all liberal-to-progressive nationalists support this, and mainstream liberal-to-progressive media ("한경오") oppose racism against Chinese and Japanese race. However, they also rarely mention racial discrimination against white people.

Countercriticism of 'criticism of Korean ethnic nationalism' 
Liberals and progressives rather argue that minjok ideology is never racist because it is not related to xenophobia, but rather that kukmin ideology is absolutely "anti-communist racism/ethinism". They believe that 'anti-minjok ideology' (반민족주의) is linked to right-wing "kukkajuui" (국가주의, "statism"/"statist nationalism") and pro-Japanese conservatism. Some South Korean scholars view "statist nationalism" based on the anti-communism and kukmin ideology of former far-right dictatorships such as Syngman Rhee and Park Chung-hee as more violent, exclusive, and xenophobic than liberal minjok ideology. They believe that those who are hostile to North Korea also have hostility toward foreigners. Therefore, some South Korean scholars criticize the 'criticism of ethinc nationalism' as being too American/European-centered.

White privilege and GDP racism 
Criticism of South Korea's 'anti-Japanese sentiment' and 'ethnic solidarity against North Korea' by some American scholars, including Robert E. Kelly and BR Myers, faced opposition from South Korean society. Those who see criticism of Korean ethnic nationalism as inappropriate mainly point out 'white privilege' or 'Japanese privilege'. Koreans' racism against Hines Ward, for example, is because he was black people. According to OhmyNews, a South Korean liberal media outlet, South Koreans' racism against Hines Ward is white supremacy, so criticism of Korean ethnic nationalism is unfair, and should be rather criticized for the white privilege prevalent in the South Korean people. South Korean liberals and progressives argue that what exists in the South is mainly "anti-communist racism/ethinism" against like Chinese and Vietnamese, and that there is no racism against the Japanese. Professor Yuji Hosaka said, "In South Korea, anti-Japanese sentiment is usually expressed only for the  Japan's country, the government, and Japanese historical revisionism, but it is not expressed to Japanese people in daily life". Yuji Hosaka is a Japanese-born naturalized Korean. The Hankyoreh, known as the centre-left/liberal media, pointed out that BR Myers has an American conservative (미국 보수주의) tendency, generalized the 2008 US beef protection in South Korea to anti-Americanism, cited an analysis of the North Korean government as an overly simple analysis, and criticized his' view as biased. Even in the conservative newspaper Munhwa Ilbo, he said that racism in Korea is not anti-Japanese racism, but rather a copycat mentality that wants to dominate someone like a Japanese in the past colonial era, and pointed out that racism in South Korea is (not Korean ethnic nationalism) "GDP-based race discrimination" based on economic power. Another conservative media outlet, the Chosun Ilbo, also referred to Korean racism as "GDP racism" (GDP 인종주의 / GDP 차별) based on "anti-communism" (반공) and "survival of the fittest" (적자생존).

See also

 Afrocentrism
 Anti-American sentiment in Korea
 Anti-Chinese sentiment in Korea
 Anti-Japanese sentiment in Korea
 Black nationalism
 Black power
 Black supremacy
 The Cleanest Race: How North Koreans See Themselves and Why it Matters
 Anti-Japaneseism (in Japan)
 Ilminism
 Japan–Korea disputes
 Juche
 Juche faction
 Korean diaspora
 Korean nationalism
 Korean nationalist historiography
 Korean history textbook controversies
 Racism in North Korea
 Racism in South Korea
 Zionism

Notes

References

Further reading
 Campbell, E. (2015), The end of ethnic nationalism? Changing conceptions of national identity and belonging among young South Koreans. Nations Natl, 21: 483–502. doi:10.1111/nana.12120.
 Chae, Ou-Byung. "Non-Western Colonial Rule and its Aftermath: Postcolonial State Formation in South Korea." Ph.D. dissertation, Department of Sociology, University of Michigan. ProQuest, 2006.
 Deacon, Chris. Perpetual ontological crisis: national division, enduring anxieties and South Korea's discursive relationship with Japan. European Journal of International Relations, doi:10.1177/1354066122114392.
 Grinker, Roy Richard. Korea and its Futures: Unification and the Unfinished War. Palgrave Macmillan, 2000.
 Jager, Sheila Miyoshi. Narratives of Nation-Building in Korea: A Genealogy of Patriotism. M.E. Sharpe, 2003.
 Kim, Nadia Y. Imperial Citizens: Koreans and Race from Seoul to LA. Stanford: Stanford University Press, 2008.
 Lee Gage, Sue-Je. "Pure Mixed Blood: The Multiple Identities of Amerasians in South Korea." Ph.D. dissertation, Department of Anthropology, Indiana University. ProQuest, 2007.
 Pai, Hyung Il. Constructing "Korean" Origins: A Critical Review of Archaeology, Historiography, and Racial Myth in Korean State-Formation Theories. Harvard University Asia Center, 2000.
 Pai, Hyung Il, and Timothy R. Tangherlini (eds.). Nationalism and the Construction of Korean Identity. Institute of East Asian Studies, University of California, 1998.
 Schmid, Andre. Korea Between Empires, 1895–1919. Columbia University Press, 2002.
 Shin, Gi-Wook, and Michael Robinson (eds.). Colonial Modernity in Korea. Cambridge, MA: Harvard University East Asia Center, distributed by Harvard University Press, 2001.
 Shin, Gi-Wook. Ethnic Nationalism in Korea: Genealogy, Politics, and Legacy. Stanford: Stanford University Press, 2006.

External links

Anti-Americanism
Anti-Chinese sentiment in Korea
Anti-Japanese sentiment in Korea
Anti-white racism
Cultural geography
Ethnic nationalism
Ethnocentrism
Korean nationalism
Human rights abuses in South Korea
Identity politics in Korea
Political theories
Politics and race
Racism in Asia
Racism in South Korea
Scientific racism
Sociology of culture